Oldham is a rural community in Sevier County, Tennessee. Alternative names for the area are Oldham's Creek and Boogertown.

The community was named for Stephen Oldham, a pioneer settler.

References 

Unincorporated communities in Sevier County, Tennessee
Unincorporated communities in Tennessee